Pyractomena is a genus of fireflies in the family Lampyridae. There are at least 20 described species in Pyractomena.

Species

References

Further reading

 
 
 
 
 
 
 
 

Lampyridae
Lampyridae genera
Bioluminescent insects